Konkandiva Fort (transliteration: Konkandiva Qilа̄) is a fort located 70 km from Pune in Maharashtra. This fort is on the boundary of Raigad and Pune district. The fort was important as a surveillance fort to keep watch on the possible attack on the Raigad fort  through Ghol Village side along the Mutha river.

How to reach
There are two routes to reach the fort. The route from Konkan region is tough and the nearest town is Mahad which is 61  km from Mumbai. The base village of the fort is Sandoshi which is 32  km from Mahad. There are good hotels at Mahad. The trekking path passes through the kavlya ghat hillock north of the Sandoshi. The second route starts from Village Gajarewadi which is near Ghol in Pune district. This route is very safe and wide. Both the routes meet at a col on the northern side of the fort. The trek path is then steep and requires efforts to climb in rainy season.  The villagers from the local village Gajrewadi make night stay and food arrangements at a reasonable cost.

Places to see
There is a cave and a few rock-cut water cisterns on the fort to be seen.

Gallery

See also 
 List of forts in Maharashtra
 List of forts in India
 Marathi People
 List of Maratha dynasties and states
 Maratha Army
 Maratha titles
 Military history of India
 List of people involved in the Maratha Empire

References 

 
Buildings and structures of the Maratha Empire
Forts in Raigad district
16th-century forts in India
Caves of Maharashtra
Tourist attractions in Raigad district
Indian rock-cut architecture